The Columbia Fireflies are a Minor League Baseball team based in Columbia, South Carolina, and are the Single-A affiliate of the Kansas City Royals of Major League Baseball. Their home stadium is Segra Park. The team was previously known as the Savannah Sand Gnats (1995–2015); they relocated from Savannah, Georgia, after the 2015 season. They are the only professional baseball team in Columbia, and the first since the Capital City Bombers moved to Greenville, South Carolina, after the 2004 season.

History
Minor league baseball in Columbia dates back to 1982. The Capital City Bombers moved from Columbia, South Carolina, to Greenville, South Carolina, after the 2004 season. The city of Columbia approved plans to build a stadium in 2014, with the goal of attracting a Minor League Baseball team. Spirit Communications, a local telecommunications company, purchased the naming rights for the stadium. In May 2015, the Savannah Sand Gnats of the Class A South Atlantic League, an affiliate of the New York Mets, announced that it would move to Columbia in time for the 2016 season.

After receiving over 2,300 submissions in a public contest to name the team, it chose to call itself the "Columbia Fireflies". The name was inspired by the Photinus frontalis in the nearby Congaree National Park which was outlined in an article entitled “Synchronized fireflies putting on show at Congaree National Park” by The State, a local newspaper. Portions of the team's uniforms glow in the dark as a tribute to the team's name.

Columbia earned its first ever victory as the Fireflies on April 9, 2016. In the game, three pitchers (Thomas McIlraith, Alex Palsha, and Johnny Magliozzi) combined to throw a no-hitter in a 9–0 shutout victory over the Charleston RiverDogs. The no-hitter was the Fireflies' third game. In their first ever home game, on April 14, 2016, the Fireflies defeated the Greenville Drive, 4–1, in front of 9,077 people.

In conjunction with Major League Baseball's reconfiguration of the minors in 2021, the Mets discontinued their affiliation with Columbia. On December 9, 2020, Major League Baseball announced that the Fireflies' new parent club would be the Kansas City Royals beginning with the 2021 season. They were organized into the Low-A East as the Royals' Low-A classification affiliate. In 2022, the Low-A East became known as the Carolina League, the name historically used by the regional circuit prior to the 2021 reorganization.

Roster

Retired Numbers
14: Larry Doby
20: Frank Robinson
42: Jackie Robinson

References

External links
 
 Statistics from Baseball-Reference

Professional baseball teams in South Carolina
Sports in Columbia, South Carolina
Kansas City Royals minor league affiliates
New York Mets minor league affiliates
2016 establishments in South Carolina
Baseball teams established in 2016
Carolina League teams
Defunct South Atlantic League teams